Humbert, Umbert or Humberto (Latinized Humbertus) is a Germanic given name, from hun "warrior" and beraht "bright". It also came into use as a surname.

Given name
Royalty and Middle Ages 
 Emebert (died 710)
 Humbert of Maroilles (before 652 – 680)
 Humbert (bishop of Würzburg) (died 842)
 Humbert I, Count of Savoy (980 – 1047 or 1048)
 Humbert II, Count of Savoy (1065–1103)
 Humbert III, Count of Savoy (1135–1189)
 Humbert, bastard of Savoy (c.1318–1374), soldier
 Humbert V de Beaujeu (1198–1250)
 Humbert I of Viennois (1240–1307), Dauphin of the Viennois
 Humbert II of Viennois (1312–1355), Dauphin of the Viennois
 Humbert I of Italy (1844–1900)
 Humbert II of Italy (1904–1983)
 Humbert of Silva Candida (1015–1061), Roman Catholic cardinal and Benedictine oblate
 Humbert of Romans (died 1277), master general of the Dominicans
Others
Humbert Achamer-Pifrader, Austrian jurist, member of the SS of Nazi Germany and commander of Einsatzgruppe A, one of the major perpetrators of the Holocaust
Marshal Humberto de Alencar Castelo Branco, Brazilian military leader and politician, President of Brazil and the first President of the Brazilian military dictatorship 
Humberto Delgado, General of the Portuguese Air Force, diplomat and politician
 Humberto Ortega, Nicaraguan military leader and published writer, Minister of Defense of Nicaragua, one of the principal commanders of  Sandinista revolution 
Humbert Roque Versace, United States Army officer

Surname
 Agnès Humbert (1894–1963), French art historian and member of the French Resistance during World War II, daughter of Charles Humbert
 Albert Jenkins Humbert (1822–1877), British architect
 Charles Humbert (1866–1927), French politician and newspaper proprietor, father of Agnès Humbert 
 Christophe Humbert (born 1979), French judoka
 Gustav Humbert (born 1950), German CEO
 Jean-Henri Humbert (1887–1967), French botanist
 Jean Humbert (painter) (1734–1749), Dutch painter
 Jean Emile Humbert (1771–1839), Dutch military engineer who rediscovered ancient Carthage
 Jean Joseph Amable Humbert (1755–1823), French general
 Manon Humbert (born 1989), French curler
 Marie Humbert, Ghanaian actress
 Marie Georges Humbert (1859–1921), mathematician
Humbert surface
Pierre Humbert (architect) (1848–????)
Pierre Humbert (mathematician) (1891–1953), for whom are named:
Humbert polynomials
Humbert series
 Nicole Humbert (née Rieger) (born 1972), German pole vaulter
 Thérèse Humbert (1856–1918), French female fraudster
 Ugo Humbert (1998- ), French tennis player

Companies
Humbert Aviation, a French aircraft manufacturer

Fictional characters
 Humbert Humbert, narrator of the novel Lolita
 Baron Humbert von Gikkingen, an animated cat creation from Whisper of the Heart (film) and The Cat Returns
 PuffPuff Humbert, frontman of the virtual band Your Favorite Martian.
 Graham Humbert, character Once Upon a Time (TV Series)

See also
 Humbert, Pas-de-Calais, a commune in the Pas-de-Calais département in France
 Humberht (disambiguation)
 Umberto, an Italian masculine given name
 Humberto, a Portuguese and Spanish masculine given name

Surnames from given names